The 2011 Schmirler Curling Classic was held from September 23 to 26 at the Caledonian Curling Club in Regina, Saskatchewan. The purse of the event was CAD$47,000, and the champion, Liudmila Privivkova won CAD$12,000.

Teams

Round robin standings

Playoffs

External links

Schmirler Curling Classic
Schmirler Curling Classic
Schmirler Curling Classic
Schmirler Curling Classic
Sports competitions in Regina, Saskatchewan
Curling in Saskatchewan